Mediation, in legal practise, is a form of alternative dispute resolution.

Mediation(s) may also refer to:

 Cultural mediation, a mechanism of human development
 Data mediation, data transformation via a mediating data model
 Mediation (Marxist theory and media studies), the reconciliation of two opposing forces within a given society by a mediating object
 Mediations, journal of the Marxist Literary Group
 Mediation (statistics), a concept in psychometrics
 Telecommunications mediation, a process that converts call data to a layout that can be imported by a billing system or other application

See also
 Mediativity
 Mediatization (media), the influence of mass media on society
 Meditation (disambiguation)